Brian Francis Paynter (born 2 May 1965) is an Australian politician. He was a Liberal Party member of the Victorian Legislative Assembly from 2014 to 2018, representing the seat of Bass.

References

External links
 Parliamentary voting record of Brian Paynter at Victorian Parliament Tracker

1965 births
Living people
Liberal Party of Australia members of the Parliament of Victoria
Members of the Victorian Legislative Assembly
21st-century Australian politicians
People from Cardinia